is a district located in Kōchi Prefecture, Japan.

As of the Shimanto merger but with 2003 population statistics, the district has an estimated population of 22,402 and a density of 59.4 persons per km2. The total area is 376.77 km2.

Towns and villages
Kuroshio
Ōtsuki
Mihara

Mergers
On April 10, 2005 the old city of Nakamura, and the village of Nishitosa merged to form the new city of Shimanto.
On March 20, 2006 the towns of Taishō and Towa merged with the town of Kubokawa, from Takaoka District, to form the new town of Shimanto, in Takaoka District.
On March 20, 2006 the towns of Ōgata and Saga merged to form the new town of Kuroshio.

External links

Districts in Kōchi Prefecture